FAMO, short for Fahrzeug- und Motoren-Werke (Automobile and Engine Works) was a German vehicle manufacturer in the early 20th century.

Products
Sd.Kfz. 9: Heavy half-track used by German forces in World War II; some were also produced by Vomag and Tatra.
Marder II, produced 1942–1943.
 Wespe self-propelled artillery
 Rübezahl caterpillar tractor

References

Defence companies of Germany